Radu Albot was the defending champion, but lost in the first round to Jack Sock.

Reilly Opelka won the title, defeating Yoshihito Nishioka in the final, 7–5, 6–7(4–7), 6–2.

Seeds

Draw

Finals

Top half

Bottom half

Qualifying

Seeds

Qualifiers

Lucky losers

Qualifying draw

First qualifier

Second qualifier

Third qualifier

Fourth qualifier

References

External Links
 Main draw
 Qualifying draw

Delray Beach Open - Singles
2020 Singles
Delray Beach Open – Singles
Delray Beach Open – Singles